Sultanköy is a  town in Tekirdağ Province, Turkey.

Geography 
Sultanköy is a coastal town in Marmaraereğlisi district  of Tekirdağ Province. 
It is on the state highway  which connects İstanbul to Tekirdağ. The population of Sultanköy is 2708 as of 2011.

History 
Although there was a settlement named Parolionthos around the present town in the ancient age, Sultanköy was founded in the 16th century by the Turkmen people from Iran and was named as Sultanşah. Later the suffix -şah was replaced by -köy. The settlement suffered during the wars in the last years of the Ottoman Empire. It was occupied by the Russians in the Russo-Turkish War (1877–1878), by the Bulgarians in the First Balkan War and by the Greeks after the First World War. In 1999 it was declared a seat of township.

Economy
The industrial site to the north and east of the town is a major source of revenue for the town residents. There is also a natural gas power plant in the town.

References

Populated places in Tekirdağ Province
Towns in Turkey
Marmara Ereğlisi District
Populated coastal places in Turkey